Qaleh-ye Gol or Qaleh Gol may refer to:
 Qaleh Gol, Gilan
 Qaleh-ye Gol, Kohgiluyeh and Boyer-Ahmad